Blazing Bullets is a 1951 American Western film directed by Wallace Fox and starring Johnny Mack Brown, Lois Hall and Stanley Price.

Plot

Cast
 Johnny Mack Brown as Marshal Johnny Mack Brown 
 Lois Hall as Carol Roberts 
 House Peters Jr. as Bill Grant 
 Stanley Price as Hawkins - Henchman 
 Dennis Moore as Crowley - Henchman 
 Edmund Cobb as Sheriff 
 Milburn Morante as Andy Mullins 
 Forrest Taylor as John Roberts

References

Bibliography
 Boyd Magers & Michael G. Fitzgerald. Westerns Women: Interviews with 50 Leading Ladies of Movie and Television Westerns from the 1930s to the 1960s. McFarland, 2004.

External links
 

1951 films
1951 Western (genre) films
American Western (genre) films
Films directed by Wallace Fox
Monogram Pictures films
American black-and-white films
1950s English-language films
1950s American films